Alexander Hatrick (29 August 1857 – 30 July 1918) was a New Zealand merchant, shipowner, tourism entrepreneur and mayor. He was born in Smythesdale, Victoria, Australia on 29 August 1857.

References

1857 births
1918 deaths
New Zealand businesspeople
People from Smythesdale, Victoria
Australian emigrants to New Zealand
Mayors of Wanganui